Established in 1819 as Garde-Landwehr Kavallerie Regiment, they were a light cavalry regiment of Uhlans of the Royal Prussian Army. The regiment was later reorganised as heavy cavalry Uhlans and renamed into 1. Garde Ulanen Regiment (1826) and fought in the Austro-Prussian and Franco-Prussian war. In World War I the regiment was part of the Guards Cavalry Division fighting on the Western and Eastern Front.

See also
List of Imperial German cavalry regiments

References

Guards cavalry regiments of the Prussian Army
Military units and formations established in 1819